Fu Nam, formerly called Fu Yu is one of the 29 constituencies in the Sai Kung District.

The constituency returns one district councillor to the Sai Kung District Council, with an election every four years.

Fu Nam constituency is loosely based on Fu Ning Garden, Residence Oasis and Yu Ming Court in Tseung Kwan O with estimated population of 16,981.

Councillors represented

Election results

2010s

References

Tseung Kwan O
Constituencies of Hong Kong
Constituencies of Sai Kung District Council
1999 establishments in Hong Kong
Constituencies established in 1999